This is a list of  engineering colleges in Kanpur, India.

About engineering in India
There are a number of engineering colleges in India. They are both private and government owned and spread across all parts of India.

Here is a comprehensive list and information on engineering colleges  in Kanpur, India.

References

Engineering colleges
Kanpur
Engineering colleges